MIR9-3 host gene is a protein that in humans is encoded by the MIR9-3HG gene.

References

Further reading 

Human proteins